Gary Curtis is an American former racing driver from Chanhassen, Minnesota. He won the 2001 ALMS Panoz GTS series.

Beginning in the 1970s, Curtis raced motorcycles, earning two state and three regional championships along with 69 wins and 188 top five finishes in state, regional and national competition. From this start, Curtis moved on to compete in the Bondurant Racing School Pro Search program. The following year, he competed in Formula 2000 races in both the US and Canada.
By the 1990s, Curtis was winning SCCA races, and in 1992 Donnybrooke Motorsports became his primary sponsor. In 1997 and 1998 he won his class in the Minneapolis Grand Prix. In 2000 and 2001 he raced in the American Le Mans Panoz GTS Pro Series, winning the championship in 2001.

Curtis currently lives in Minnesota and is the chief driving instructor  for BIR Performance. He runs racing schools at the Brainerd International Raceway.

Notes 

Living people
People from Brainerd, Minnesota
Racing drivers from Minnesota
Year of birth missing (living people)